The1967 France rugby union tour of South Africa was a series of matches played between July and August 1967 by France national rugby union team in South Africa and Rhodesia

Results
Scores and results list France's points tally first.

Touring party

 Manager:
 Assistant Manager:
 Captain: Christian Darrouy

Full backs

Three-quarters

Half-backs

Forwards

France tour
1967
1967 in South African rugby union
1966–67 in French rugby union